Bronagh or Bronágh may refer to:

Alleged Celtic Goddess Bronach (also called Cailleach) 
Saint Brónach (sometimes anglicised to Bronagh), a 6th-century holy woman from Ireland 
Bronagh Gallagher (born 1972), Irish Singer 
Bronágh Taggart, Irish  writer,
Bronagh Waugh (born 1982), Northern Irish actress

See also
Branagh